Input was a Sunday morning public access talk show co-produced by Marion Stokes and her husband John that aired locally in Philadelphia from 1967 to 1971.

Summary
Its focus was mainly on social justice topics ranging from religion to violence.

See also
Recorder: The Marion Stokes Project
 CBS

External links 
Archive of episodes at the Internet Archive.
Two episodes featuring African American musician Arthur Hall each posted by Ife Ife Films on its official Vimeo channel

References 

American Sunday morning talk shows
1967 American television series debuts
1971 American television series endings